Unitan  may refer to:
 Unitán, an Argentine company producing quebracho tannins
 the mascot of the 1985 Summer Universiade